The Bear is a 2012 Iranian film directed and written by Khosro Masumi. It is about a carpenter who is abducted by the Iraqis during the Iran–Iraq War. When he is released, he discovers his wife has remarried. The Bear was nominated for the Asia Pacific Screen Award for Best Feature Film at the 2012 Asia Pacific Screen Awards, losing to Beyond the Hill.

Plot
During Iran-Iraq war Noor Aldin who is a carpenter is missing. He is captured by Iraqi army. After 8 years he returns home, but finds out that in his absence his wife is married to another man...

Cast

References

External links
 

Iranian drama films
Iran–Iraq War films